The thin blue line is a colloquial term for police forces.

The Thin Blue Line or Thin Blue Line may also refer to:

Films
 The Thin Blue Line (1966 film), a documentary film by William Friedkin about the police and the problems they encounter
 The Thin Blue Line (1988 film), a documentary film by Errol Morris concerning the murder of a police officer

TV series
 The Thin Blue Line (American TV series), a 1952 American panel show produced by LAPD Chief William H. Parker
 The Thin Blue Line (British TV series), a 1995–1996 British sitcom set in a police station
 Thin Blue Line (Swedish TV series), a 2021 Swedish police drama series set in Malmö

Other uses
 Thin Blue Line, a 2009 NASA side-view photograph of Earth's atmosphere

See also
 Blue Line (disambiguation)
 Long Blue Line (disambiguation)
 The Thin Red Line (disambiguation)
 Thin Blue Line Act, or H.R. 115, a U.S. law passed in January 2017
 Thin Blue Line flag, a symbol used by Blue Lives Matter and far-right movements